Bjelovar-Bilogora County is a county in central Croatia.

The central town of Bjelovar was first mentioned in 1413, and it only gained importance when a new fort was built in 1756 to defend against the Ottoman invasions. The town was pronounced a free royal town in 1874.

The other part of the county name is for the hill of Bilogora that stretches along the northern edge of the county.

Other towns in the county are Daruvar, Garešnica, Čazma and Grubišno Polje.

The Bjelovar-Bilogora County borders on the Koprivnica-Križevci County in the north, Virovitica-Podravina County in the northeast, Požega-Slavonia County in the southeast, Sisak-Moslavina County in the southwest and Zagreb County in the west.

Alongside the City of Zagreb and Požega-Slavonia County, it is the only Croatian county that does not border another nation.

Administrative division
Bjelovar-Bilogora County is further divided into 5 towns and 18 municipalities.

Demographics

As of the 2011 census, the county had 119,764 residents. The population density is 45 people per km2.

Ethnic Croats form the majority with 84.8% of the population, followed by Serbs at 6.3% and Czechs at 5.2%.

Protected areas
 Papuk

See also
Bjelovar-Križevci County
List of people from Bjelovar-Bilogora County

References

External links

 
 Turistička zajednica Bjelovarsko-bilogorske županije Tourist Board

 
Counties of Croatia